Northern Bahr el Ghazal is a state in South Sudan. It has an area of 30,543 km² and is part of the Bahr el Ghazal region. It borders East Darfur in Sudan to the north, Western Bahr el Ghazal to the west and south, and Warrap and the disputed region of Abyei to the east. Aweil is the capital of the state.

History

Because of its proximity to Kordofan and the presence of a railway line through it to Wau, it suffered extensively in the 1983–2005 civil war in southern Sudan. North Bahr al Ghazal and adjacent parts of Western Kordofan to the north were among the most politically sensitive regions in Sudan. Missriya Arabs from Kordofan have interacted with Dinka in this region over a long time. While relations during the colonial era were largely peaceful, the war saw an upsurge in hostilities. Government backing to the Missriya gave them a decided advantage over local Dinka groups, and raiding by murahileen militias (and other government backed groups, including some Dinka militias) resulted in considerable loss of life, widespread abduction and pillaging of Dinka villages. Many of these raids coincided with the movement of government trains to and from Kordofan to Wau.

It had the highest rate of poverty, 76% according to government statistics, of the 10 states of South Sudan.

In October 2015, President Salva Kiir divided the original ten states of South Sudan into 28 states. Northern Bahr el Ghazal was divided into the new states of Aweil, Aweil East, and a part of Lol. 

On 22 January 2020, Northern Bahr el Ghazal, along with the rest of the original ten states of South Sudan, was re-established at the conclusion of a peace agreement resolving the South Sudanese Civil War. Tong Aken Ngor, appointed by President Kiir as Governor of Aweil State in 2019, was sworn in as the Governor of Northern Bahr el Ghazal in the wake of the state's re-establishment.

Geography
Situated in South Sudan's Bahr el Ghazal region, Northern Bahr el Ghazal occupies a majority of a region that is characterized by grassland floodplains and tropical savanna that make up around 33,559 km², extending outward into neighboring Western Bahr el Ghazal and Warrap. Each county is divided into three geographical areas of different ground and water height. These areas are locally referred to as low-, middle-, or highlands - though there are actually no highlands in the state. The lowlands are only accessible during the dry season because annually, from May through November, the areas are flooded. Each county also has their own intermittent rivers that locals use for drinking water.

The Lol River, which crosses the state, is a tributary of the Bahr al-Arab, flowing downstream from Unity, slicing westward through Warrap and Northern Bahr el Ghazal, and ending in Western Bahr el Ghazal.

Hazards
Annual floods are common throughout Northern Bahr el Ghazal, affecting residential areas. In 2008, a flood in Aweil South County displaced 40,000 people. In 2010, a flood took out 70% of livestock and crops in Aweil South County and Aweil West County; in Aweil, around 60% was destroyed. Thousands of people were greatly affected by the flood in 2010.

Government
Retired Gen. Salva Chol Ayat was the last Acting governor of the state. He replaced Kuel Aguer Kuel in April 2015.The incumbent governor is Hon. Tong Aken Ngor.

Administration
Northern Bahr al Ghazal, like other states in South Sudan, is divided into counties; there are five counties, headed by a County Commissioner, as detailed below:

The counties are further divided into Payams, then Bomas.

Infrastructure
By 2009, accessibility of Northern Bahr al Ghazal had been greatly improved. In 2007, the reconstruction of roads and bridges began. All county headquarters across the state were connected by all-weather roads with the exception of Aroyo, then the capital of Aweil Center County. In 2019, the Food and Agriculture Organization of the United Nations announced a project to develop multi-purpose water infrastructure in Koum.

References

Books
 Francis M. Deng, 1995, War of Visions, Conflict of Identities in the Sudan, (Washington D.C.: Brookings)
 Human Rights Watch, 1999, Famine in Sudan, 1998, The Human Rights Causes, (New York, Human Rights Watch).
 Dave Eggers, 2006, What is the What, (New York, Vintage Books).
 David Keen, 1994, The Benefits of Famine, A Political Economy of Famine and Relief in Southwestern Sudan, 1983–1989, (New Jersey, Princeton University Press).
 Garang Malong, 2012, Theatre of Hope (Nairobi University, Kenya)
 Aweil graduates network (2013)

External links
 John Ryle, Jok Madut Jok and Fergus Boyle, 2003, Sudan Abduction and Slavery Project, Abductee Database 2003 Report
 "Northern Bahr el Ghazal State gets in new cabinet" 

 
States of South Sudan
Bahr el Ghazal